I am Sartana, Your Angel of Death is a 1969 Italian Western film directed by Giuliano Carnimeo and starring Gianni Garko as Sartana.  The film is presented on some DVD reissues under its German title, Sartana - Töten war sein täglich Brot.

Plot
A man disguised as Sartana leads a gang in robbing a bank of $300,000. While the real Sartana tries to prove his innocence and find the imposter, he is constantly pursued by bounty hunters: some who only care about the $10,000 reward on his head, a few who are more interested in locating the stolen money and one who mixes bad luck at gambling with good luck in bounty-hunting.

Cast
 Gianni Garko as Sartana
 Frank Wolff as Buddy Ben
 Klaus Kinski as Hot Dead
 Gordon Mitchell as Deguejo
 Ettore Manni as Baxter Red
 Sal Borgese as Fetente
 Renato Baldini as The Judge
 Federico Boido as Bill

Production
Carnimeo stated that Gianni Garko who plays Sartana came up with many of the illusions and tricks that Sartana would perform in the film. Unlike  Gianfranco Parolini, the director of If You Meet Sartana Pray for Your Death, Carnimeo stated he did not have any issues shooting the film with Klaus Kinski. Carnimeo said that Kinski arrived on set, proceeded to costumes and make-up and then on set and that Kinski was "meticulous and precise like a Swiss watch."

Release
I am Sartana, Your Angel of Death was released in November 1969.

See also
 Klaus Kinski filmography
 List of Italian films of 1969

References

External links

1969 films
1969 Western (genre) films
1960s Italian-language films
Spaghetti Western films
Films directed by Giuliano Carnimeo
1960s Italian films